The women's road race of the 2009 UCI Road World Championships cycling event took place on 26 September in Mendrisio, Switzerland. The race was won by Italy's Tatiana Guderzo, followed by Marianne Vos (Netherlands) and Noemi Cantele (Italy).

Participating nations

Final classification

References

Women's Road Race
UCI Road World Championships – Women's road race
2009 in women's road cycling